Kirto Sharif is a village located in the Muridke Tehsil of Sheikhupura District, Punjab, Pakistan. It is dominated by the Jat clan of Buttar.

Surroundings
Situated at Narowal Mureedike road, 23 km from Mureedike, 54 km from Lahore, 60 km from Gujranwala, 60 km from Narowal.

Villages in Sheikhupura District